The 1808 United Kingdom heat wave was a period of exceptionally high temperatures during July 1808. In the Central England Temperature series, dating back to 1659, at the time it was the 2nd hottest July on record, the hottest since 1783. As of 2022, it is the 9th hottest July on record. The month included some of the highest temperatures ever recorded in the UK. Temperature records from this time are likely dubious as the Stevenson screen was not introduced until the 1860s.

Weather 
July 1808 was the second hottest July on record, at the time with an extreme notable heatwave from the 12th to 15 July, peaking on the 13th and 14th.
 Reports from Weather Stations around the United Kingdom

When the heatwave was coming to a close on the 15th, there were some very severe thunderstorms. These most severe of the storms affected Dorset, Somerset & Gloucestershire. However, a  swath was also damaged between Bath and Bristol. Ball Lightning was also observed in Gloucester, and was noted as destroying one of the pinnacles at the west end of Gloucester Cathedral. It is thought that this is one of the most severe hailstorms in the history of the United Kingdom, along with that of 1697.

Impacts 
As a result of the hot temperatures and following thunderstorms, many people lost their lives, especially in the counties of Bedfordshire, Buckinghamshire and Northampton. Animals were also badly affected as a result of the hot weather, with 50 post horses dying as a result on the Great North Road alone. Farmers also struggled. Despite being able to harvest their crops early, other products melted quickly such as butter and honeycomb.

References 

 The Times - Simons, P - Killer heatwave that brutalised Britain (13 July 2018)
 Clark, C - The heatwave over England and the great hailstorm in Somerset, July 1808 (29 December 2006)

External links 

Heat waves in the United Kingdom
1808 in the United Kingdom
1808 disasters in the United Kingdom